Leptostales pannaria, the pannaria wave moth, is a species of geometrid moth in the family Geometridae.

The MONA or Hodges number for Leptostales pannaria is 7173.

References

Further reading

External links

 

Sterrhinae
Articles created by Qbugbot
Moths described in 1858